Samson Abramsky  (born 12 March 1953) is Professor of Computer Science at University College London. He was previously the Christopher Strachey Professor of Computing at the University of Oxford, from 2000 to 2021.
He has made contributions to the areas of domain theory, the lazy lambda calculus, strictness analysis, concurrency theory, interaction categories, geometry of interaction, game semantics and quantum computing. More recently, he has been applying methods from categorical semantics to finite model theory, with applications to descriptive complexity.

Education 
Abramsky was educated at Hasmonean Grammar School for Boys, Hendon and at King's College, Cambridge (BA 1975, MA Philosophy 1979, Diploma in Computer Science) and Queen Mary, University of London (PhD Computer Science 1988, supervised by Richard Bornat).

Career and research 
Since 2021, Abramsky is Professor of Computer Science at University College London. He has  been a Fellow of the Royal Society since 2004. His research includes the development of game semantics, domain theory in logical form, and categorical quantum mechanics.

His earlier positions include:

 Programmer, GEC Computers Limited, 1976–1978
 Lecturer, Department of Computer Science and Statistics, QMUL, 1980–1983
 Lecturer, 1983–1988, reader, 1988–1990, professor, 1990–1995, Department of Computing, Imperial College London
 Professor of Theoretical Computer Science, University of Edinburgh, 1996–2000
 Christopher Strachey Professor of Computing, University of Oxford, 2000-2021

Abramsky has played a leading role in the development of game semantics, and its applications to the semantics of programming languages. Other notable contributions include his work on domain theory in logical form, the lazy lambda calculus, strictness analysis, concurrency theory, interaction categories, and geometry of interaction. He has recently been working on high-level methods for quantum computation and information.

Selected publications 
Samson Abramsky co-edited 6 Volumes Handbook of Logic in Computer Science with Dov Gabbay and Tom Maibaum.
 1992. Volume 1: Background: Mathematical Structures.
 1992. Volume 2: Background: Computational Structures.
 1995. Volume 3: Semantic Structures.
 1995. Volume 4: Semantic Modelling.
 2001. Volume 5: Logic and Algebraic Methods.
 Volume 6: Logical methods in computer science.

Samson Abramsky has published over two hundred publications and his h-index was 57 as of October 2019.
 1986. Strictness analysis for higher-order functions. (with GL Burn, C Hankin). Science of Computer Programming.
 1990. The Lazy Lambda Calculus. Research Topics in Functional Programming.
 1993. Computational Interpretations of Linear logic. in Theoretical Computer Science 111
 1994. Domain Theory. (with A Jung). in Handbook of Logic in Computer Science 3.
 1996. Interaction categories and the foundations of typed concurrent programming. (with S Gay and R Nagarajan). NATO ASI SERIES F COMPUTER AND SYSTEMS SCIENCES 152
 1997. Specifying interaction categories. (with D Pavlović). Category Theory and Computer Science
 2002. Geometry of interaction and linear combinatory algebras. (with E Haghverdi and P Scott). Mathematical Structures in Computer Science 12 (5)
 2003. Sequentiality vs. concurrency in games and logic. Mathematical Structures in Computer Science 13 (4)

Some of the recent works of Samson Abramsky include:
 2013. Robust Constraint Satisfaction and Local Hidden Variables in Quantum Mechanics. (with G. Gottlob and P. Kolaitis). IJCAI 2013
 2012. Logical Bell Inequalities. (with Lucien Hardy). In Physical Review A. Vol. 85. No. ARTN 062114
 2010. Introduction to categories and categorical logic. (with N. Tzevelekos). In New Structures for Physics. Springer.

Awards and honours 
Abramsky is a Fellow of the Royal Society (2004), a Fellow of the Royal Society of Edinburgh (2000), and a Member of Academia Europaea (1993). He is a member of the editorial boards of the North Holland Studies in Logic and the Foundations of Mathematics, and of the Cambridge Tracts in Theoretical Computer Science. He was general chair of LiCS 2000–2003, and is a member of the LiCS Organizing Committee.

 He was elected Fellow of ACM (2014) For contributions to domains in logical form, game semantics, categorical quantum mechanics, and contextual semantics. 
 He was awarded the BCS Lovelace Medal in 2013
 His paper "Domain theory in Logical Form" won the LiCS Test-of-Time award (a 20-year retrospective) for 1987. The award was presented at LiCS 2007.
 He was awarded an EPSRC Senior Research Fellowship on Foundational Structures and Methods for Quantum Informatics in 2007.
 Fellow of the Royal Society (2004)
 Fellow of the Royal Society of Edinburgh (2000)

Abramsky's nomination for the Royal Society reads:

References 

1953 births
Living people
Alumni of King's College, Cambridge
Alumni of Queen Mary University of London
Fellows of Wolfson College, Oxford
Members of the Department of Computer Science, University of Oxford
Academics of Queen Mary University of London
Academics of Imperial College London
Academics of the University of Edinburgh
British computer scientists
20th-century British Jews
British people of Belarusian-Jewish descent
Jewish scientists
Formal methods people
Fellows of the Royal Society of Edinburgh
Fellows of the Royal Society
Members of Academia Europaea